Slovakia will send 13 competitors to compete in three disciplines at the 2010 Winter Paralympics in Vancouver, British Columbia, Canada.

Medalists

Alpine skiing 

Slovakia fielded a team of 11 delegates into the Alpine Ski competition at the 2010 Winter Paralympics, with all of the medals being won by alpine skiers. The medalists are:
 
  Henrieta Farkasova - Women's Super Combined, visually impaired 
  Henrieta Farkasova - Women's Super G, visually impaired 
  Henrieta Farkasova - Women's Giant Slalom, visually impaired 
  Jakub Krako - Men's Super Combined, visually impaired
  Jakub Krako - Men's Giant Slalom, visually impaired 
  Jakub Krako - Men's Slalom, visually impaired 
  Jakub Krako - Men's Super-G, visually impaired 
  Henrieta Farkasova - Women's Downhill, visually impaired 
  Miroslav Haraus - Men's Super-G, visually impaired 
  Miroslav Haraus - Men's Super Combined, visually impaired
  Petra Smarzova - Women's Giant Slalom, standing

Biathlon

Cross-country skiing

See also
Slovakia at the 2010 Winter Olympics
Slovakia at the Paralympics

References

External links
Vancouver 2010 Paralympic Games official website
International Paralympic Committee official website

Nations at the 2010 Winter Paralympics
2010
Paralympics